Beauchene may refer to:

 Jacques Gouin de Beauchene, French explorer
 Beauchene Island, Falklands named after him
Edmé François Chauvot de Beauchêne (1780-1830) French anatomist.